The butterfly perch (Caesioperca lepidoptera) is a marine species of ray-finned fish in the subfamily Anthiinae, part of the sea bass family Serranidae. This fish is found in the eastern Indian Ocean, and the southwestern Pacific Ocean, including the waters around southern Australia and New Zealand.  It is sometimes known as the red perch.

Description
It is a pinkish colour and has a large black spot towards the posterior end. Adults have a blue band just behind the eye, blue margins to the fins and small blue spots. The pectoral fins are about as long as the head. This fish is often confused with the closely related barber perch (Caesioperca rasor). However, the butterfly perch has a deeper body, and males are more pink with a dark blotch rather than band on the side.

Distribution and habitat
In Australia it mainly occurs along the coasts of Western Australia, South Australia, Victoria, Tasmania and New South Wales. It is a schooling fish and is found on and around coastal reefs where it feeds on plankton. The butterfly perch shelters in crevices and caves at night.

Behaviour
The butterfly perch congregates in dense shoals in deep water near reefs. It is a demersal fish, feeding on planktonic organisms and such bottom-dwelling invertebrates as sea squirts, pyrosomes, coral polyps, polychaete worms, copepods and shrimps.

References

 Tony Ayling & Geoffrey Cox, Collins Guide to the Sea Fishes of New Zealand,  (William Collins Publishers Ltd, Auckland, New Zealand 1982) 

butterfly perch
Marine fish of New Zealand
Taxa named by Johann Reinhold Forster
butterfly perch